This is a List of Oshawa Generals seasons.

The Generals celebrated their 70th anniversary during the 2007–08 OHL season. Oshawa has won five Memorial Cups, thirteen J. Ross Robertson Cups, the Hamilton Spectator Trophy three times, and the Leyden Trophy five times.

Season-by-season results
Complete data is unavailable from 1908 to 1937. The team did not operate in the OHA between the 1953–54 and 1961–62 seasons.

Regular season
Legend: OL = Overtime loss, SL = Shootout loss

Playoffs
1937–1938 Defeated Toronto Marlboros. Defeated Guelph Indians in OHA finals. OHA CHAMPIONS Lost to St. Boniface Seals in Memorial Cup Series.
1938–1939 Defeated St. Michael's Majors in semi-finals. Defeated Toronto Native Sons in OHA finals. OHA CHAMPIONS  Defeated North Bay Trappers. Defeated Verdun Maple Leafs. Defeated Edmonton A.C. Roamers in Memorial Cup Series. MEMORIAL CUP CHAMPIONS
1939–1940 Defeated Toronto Young Rangers in semi-finals.  Defeated Toronto Marlboros in OHA Finals. OHA CHAMPIONS Defeated South Porcupine. Defeated Verdun Maple Leafs. Defeated Kenora Thistles in Memorial Cup Series. MEMORIAL CUP CHAMPIONS
1940–1941 Defeated Toronto Marlboros in OHA finals. OHA CHAMPIONS Lost to Montreal Royals in Eastern Canadian Finals.
1941–1942 Defeated Brantford Lions in semi-finals. Defeated Guelph Biltmore Mad Hatters in OHA finals. OHA CHAMPIONS Defeated Ottawa St. Patrick's College . Lost to Portage la Prairie Terriers in Memorial Cup Series.
1942–1943 Defeated Hamilton Whizzers in semi-finals. Defeated Brantford Lions in OHA finals. OHA CHAMPIONS. Defeated Montreal Jr. Canadiens. Lost to Winnipeg Rangers in Memorial Cup Series.
1943–1944 Defeated St. Michael's Majors in OHA finals. OHA CHAMPIONS Defeated Montreal Jr. Canadiens.  Defeated Trail Smoke Eaters in Memorial Cup Series. MEMORIAL CUP CHAMPIONS
1944–1945 Defeated St. Catharines Teepees in first round. Lost to St. Michael's Majors in second round.
1945–1946 Lost to St. Michael's Majors in OHA final.
1946–1947 Lost to St. Michael's Majors.
1947–1948 Lost to Windsor Spitfires.
1948–1949 Out of playoffs.
1949–1950 Out of playoffs.
1950–1951 Lost to Windsor Spitfires.
1951–1952 Out of playoffs.
1952–1953 Lost to St. Michael's Majors.
1962–1963 Out of Metro Jr.A. playoffs.
1963–1964 Lost to St. Catharines Black Hawks 8 points to 4 in quarter-finals.
1964–1965 Lost to Niagara Falls Flyers 8 points to 4 in quarter-finals.
1965–1966 Defeated St. Catharines Black Hawks 8 points to 6 in quarter-finals. Defeated Montreal Jr. Canadiens 8 points to 2 in semi-finals. Defeated Kitchener Rangers 8 points to 2 in finals. OHA CHAMPIONS Defeated North Ontario champions North Bay Trappers.  Defeated Shawinigan Bruins for Eastern Canadian championship.  Lost to Edmonton Oil Kings in 6 games in Memorial Cup series.
1966–1967 Out of playoffs.
1967–1968 Out of playoffs.
1968–1969 Out of playoffs.
1969–1970 Defeated Hamilton Red Wings in one game tiebreaker for 8th overall by score of 5 to 4 in OT. Lost to Toronto Marlboros 8 points to 0 in quarter-finals.
1970–1971 Out of playoffs.
1971–1972 Defeated Niagara Falls Flyers 8 points to 4 in quarter-finals. Lost to Ottawa 67's 9 points to 3 in semi-finals.
1972–1973 Lost to Peterborough Petes 8 points to 0 in quarter-finals.
1973–1974 Lost to St. Catharines Black Hawks 9 points to 1 in quarter-finals.
1974–1975 Lost to Peterborough Petes 8 points to 2 in quarter-finals.
1975–1976 Lost to S.S.Marie Greyhounds 6 points to 4 in 1st round.
1976–1977 Out of playoffs.
1977–1978 Lost to Peterborough Petes 9 points to 3 in quarter-finals.
1978–1979 Lost to Sudbury Wolves 8 points to 2 in quarter-finals.
1979–1980 Lost to Ottawa 67's 4 games to 3 in quarter-finals.
1980–1981 Defeated Peterborough Petes 3 games to 2 in division quarter-final.Lost to S.S.Marie Greyhounds 8 points to 4 in division semi-finals.
1981–1982 Defeated Peterborough Petes 8 points to 2 in quarter-finals.Lost to Ottawa 67's 8 points to 6 in semi-finals.
1982–1983 Defeated Belleville Bulls 7 points to 1 in first round. Defeated Peterborough Petes 8 points to 0 in quarter-finals. Defeated Ottawa 67's 8 points to 2 in semi-finals. Defeated S.S.Marie Greyhounds 9 points to 5 in finals. OHL CHAMPIONS  Lost to Portland Winter Hawks in Memorial Cup Final 8 to 3.
1983–1984 Defeated Belleville Bulls 6 points to 0 in first round. Lost to Ottawa 67's 8 points to 0 in quarter-finals.
1984–1985 Lost to Belleville Bulls 8 points to 2 in first round.
1985–1986 Lost to Kingston Canadians 8 points to 4 in first round.
1986–1987 Defeated North Bay Centennials 4 games to 3 in Super Series. Earned 1st round bye.Defeated Kingston Canadians 4 to 2 in quarter-finals. Defeated Peterborough Petes 4 to 2 in semi-finals. Defeated North Bay Centennials 4 games to 3 in finals. OHL CHAMPIONS Lost to Medicine Hat Tigers in Memorial Cup Final 6 to 2.
1987–1988 Lost to Ottawa 67's 4 games to 3 in first round.
1988–1989 Lost to Ottawa 67's 4 games to 2 in first round.
1989–1990 Defeated Cornwall Royals 4 games to 2 in first round. Defeated Peterborough Petes 4 games to 0 in semi-finals. Defeated Kitchener Rangers 4 games to 3 in finals. OHL CHAMPIONS  Defeated Kitchener Rangers 4 to 3 in second OT in Memorial Cup Final. MEMORIAL CUP CHAMPIONS
1990–1991 Defeated Sudbury Wolves 4 games to 1 in first round. Defeated Ottawa 67's 4 to 1 in semi-finals.  Lost to S.S.Marie Greyhounds 4 games to 2 in finals.
1991–1992 Lost to Sudbury Wolves 4 games to 3 in first round.
1992–1993 Defeated Belleville Bulls 4 games to 3 in first round. Lost to Kingston Frontenacs 4 games to 2 in semi-finals.
1993–1994 Lost to Sudbury Wolves 4 games to 1 in division quarter-finals.
1994–1995 Lost to Peterborough Petes 4 games to 3 in division quarter-finals.
1995–1996 Lost to Belleville Bulls 4 games to 1 in division quarter-finals.
1996–1997 Accepted first round bye, after Ottawa 67's declined. Defeated Peterborough Petes 4 games to 2 in quarter-finals. Defeated Kitchener Rangers 4 games to 2 in semi-finals. Defeated Ottawa 67's 4 games to 2 in finals. OHL CHAMPIONS  Lost to Lethbridge Hurricanes 5 to 4 in OT in Memorial Cup semi-final.
1997–1998 Lost to Kingston Frontenacs 4 games to 3 in division quarter-finals.
1998–1999 Defeated Peterborough Petes 4 games to 1 in conference quarter-finals. Defeated Barrie Colts 4 games to 3 in conference semi-finals. Lost to Belleville Bulls 4 games to 1 in conference finals.
1999–2000 Lost to Ottawa 67's 4 games to 1 in conference quarter-finals.
2000–2001 Out of playoffs.
2001–2002 Lost to Belleville Bulls 4 games to 1 in conference quarter-finals.
2002–2003 Defeated Peterborough Petes 4 games to 3 in conference quarter-finals.  Lost to Ottawa 67's 4 games to 2 in conference semi-finals.
2003–2004 Lost to Mississauga Ice Dogs 4 games to 3 in conference quarter-finals.
2004–2005 Out of playoffs.
2005–2006 Out of playoffs.
2006–2007 Defeated Kingston Frontenacs 4 games to 1 in conference quarter-finals. Lost to Belleville Bulls 4 games to 0 in conference semi-finals.
2007–2008 Defeated Ottawa 67's 4 games to 0 in conference quarter-finals. Defeated Niagara IceDogs 4 games to 2 in conference semi-finals. Lost to Belleville Bulls 4 games to 1 in conference finals.
2008–2009 Out of playoffs.
2009–2010 Out of playoffs.
2010–2011 Defeated Kingston Frontenacs 4 games to 1 in conference quarter-finals. Lost to Niagara IceDogs 4 games to 1 in conference semi-finals.
2011–2012 Lost to Niagara IceDogs 4 games to 2 in conference quarter-finals.
2012–2013 Defeated Niagara IceDogs 4 games to 1 in conference quarter-finals. Lost to Barrie Colts 4 games to 0 in conference semi-finals.
2013-2014 Defeated Mississauga Steelheads 4 games to 0 in conference quarter-finals. Defeated Peterborough Petes 4 games to 0 in conference semi-finals. Lost to North Bay Battalion 4 games to 0 in conference finals.
2014-2015 Defeated Peterborough Petes 4 games to 1 in conference quarter-finals. Defeated Niagara IceDogs 4 games to 1 in conference semi-finals. Defeated North Bay Battalion 4 games to 2 in conference finals. Defeated Erie Otters 4 games to 1 in finals. OHL CHAMPIONS  Defeated Kelowna Rockets 2 to 1 in OT in Memorial Cup Final. MEMORIAL CUP CHAMPIONS
2015–2016 Lost to Kingston Frontenacs 4 games to 1 in conference quarter-finals.
2016–2017 Defeated Sudbury Wolves 4 games to 2 in conference quarter-finals. Lost to Mississauga Steelheads 4 games to 1 in conference semi-finals.
2017–2018 Lost to Niagara IceDogs 4 games to 1 in conference quarter-finals.
2018-2019 Defeated Peterborough Petes 4 games to 1 in conference quarter-finals. Defeated Niagara IceDogs 4 games to 2 in conference semi-finals. Lost to Ottawa 67's 4 games to 0 in conference finals.
2019–2020 Cancelled.
2020–2021 Cancelled.
2021-2022 Lost to Kingston Frontenacs 4 games to 2 in conference quarter-finals.

References
 Oshawa season-by-season results, 1946–1980 (OHA)
 Oshawa season-by-season results, 1980–2008 (OHL)

External links
Oshawa Generals Official web site

seasons